Houck Farmhouse is a historic home located at Guilderland in Albany County, New York.  It was built circa 1850 and is a two-story frame farmhouse with a -story ell in the Greek Revival style. The ell features eyebrow windows and has an enclosed pedimented portico.

It was listed on the National Register of Historic Places in 1982.

References

Houses on the National Register of Historic Places in New York (state)
Houses completed in 1850
Greek Revival houses in New York (state)
Houses in Albany County, New York
National Register of Historic Places in Albany County, New York